Michael Jackson (1958–2009) was an American recording artist. He debuted on the professional music scene at the age of 5, as a member of The Jackson 5, and began a solo career in 1971 while still a member of the group in subsequent years. Referred to as the "King of Pop", Michael Jackson is considered to be one of the greatest entertainers of all time and one of the most influential artists of the 20th century.

Jackson's career was rewarded with 13 Grammy  Awards, as well as the  Grammy Legend Award and Grammy Lifetime Achievement Award; 6 Brit Awards, 5 Billboard Music Awards and 24 American Music Awards. He currently holds 20 Guinness World Records. The organization also recognized Jackson as the world’s most successful entertainer in 2006. He's a member of the Rock and Roll Hall of Fame, becoming one of only a few artists to be inducted twice (he was inducted in 1997 as a member of The Jackson 5 and again as a solo artist in 2001). Jackson was also inducted into the National Museum of Dance and Hall of Fame, making him the first and currently, only recording artist to be inducted. He was also inducted into the Songwriters Hall of Fame. Jackson was also inducted in 2014 into the Rhythm & Blues Hall of Fame along with his father Joe Jackson.

In 1984, Jackson was approached to donate "Beat It" as backing music for a commercial on drunk driving. Jackson agreed and it was arranged for the singer to be awarded with an honor from the President of the United States, Ronald Reagan. In April 1990, Jackson returned to the White House to be recognized as "Artist of the Decade" by President George H. W. Bush. Two years later, on May 1, 1992, President Bush presented Jackson with an award acknowledging him as "a point of light ambassador". Jackson received the award in recognition for his efforts in inviting disadvantaged children to his Neverland Ranch. Jackson was the only entertainer to receive the award. He has two Primetime Emmy Award nominations in 1983 and 1990.

Awards and nominations

Pro-Set Los Angeles Music Awards

Pro-Set Los Angeles Music Awards has given Jackson two awards.

|-
|rowspan="2"| 1992 || Michael Jackson || Best Pop Male Vocalist || 
|-
| "Black or White" || Video Of The Year  ||

Puls Music TV

Puls Music TV awarded Jackson with two awards in 1998, including one for "Best Foreign Male Singer".

|-
|rowspan="2"| 1998 ||rowspan="2"| Michael Jackson || Best Foreign Male Singer || 
|-
| Best Show of the Year - 1997 || 
|-

Radio Luxembourg Golden Lion Awards

In 1993, Jackson received a Golden Lion for Lifetime Achievement from Radio Luxembourg and RTL.

|-
| 1993 || Michael Jackson || Golden Lion || 
|-

Radio Music Awards

In 2003, Jackson was honoured with a Radio Music Award for his humanitarian endeavors.

|-
| 2003 || Michael Jackson || Humanitarian Award || 
|-

Rennbahn Express Magazine (Austria)

Rennbahn Express Magazine has given Jackson two awards.

|-
| 1988 || Thriller || Video of the 80's || 
|-
| 1988 || Michael Jackson || Star of the 80's ||

Rhythm and Blues Music Hall of Fame

|-
| 2014 || Michael Jackson || Rhythm and Blues Music Hall of Fame || 
|-

Rock and Roll Hall of Fame

The Rock and Roll Hall of Fame is a museum located on the shores of Lake Erie in downtown Cleveland, Ohio, United States, dedicated to recording the history of some of the best-known and most influential artists, producers, and other people who have in some major way influenced the music industry.

Michael Jackson has been inducted into the Rock and Roll Hall of Fame twice; as a member of The Jackson 5 and as a solo artist.

|-
| 1997 || The Jackson 5 || Rock and Roll Hall of Fame || 
|-
| 2001 || Michael Jackson || Rock and Roll Hall of Fame ||

Rockbjörnen
The Rockbjörnen is a music award ceremony in Sweden, established in 1979 by the Aftonbladet, one of the largest newspapers in Nordic countries. Jackson won two awards.

|-
| 1987 || Michael Jackson || Best International Artist || 
|-
| 1992 || Dangerous || Best International Album ||

Saturn Awards
The Saturn Award is an American award presented annually by the Academy of Science Fiction, Fantasy and Horror Films; it was initially created to honor science fiction, fantasy, and horror on film, but has since grown to reward other films belonging to genre fiction, as well as on television and home media releases.

The award was originally referred to as a Golden Scroll. The Saturn Awards were created in 1973.

|-
| 1979 || Michael Jackson (for The Wiz) || Best Supporting Actor || 
|-

Smash Hits Awards

Smash Hits was a pop music based magazine, aimed at children and young teenagers, and originally published in the United Kingdom by EMAP. It ran from 1978 to 2006 and was issued fortnightly for most of that time. The name survives as a brand for a related spin-off digital television channel, digital radio station, and website which have survived the demise of the printed magazine.

Michael Jackson has won five Smash Hits related awards.

|-
| 1987 || Michael Jackson || Best Male Singer || 
|-
| 1988 || Michael Jackson || Best Male Solo Singer || 
|-
| 1992 || Michael Jackson || Best Male Solo Singer || 
|-
| 1993 || Michael Jackson || Best Male Solo Singer || 
|-
| 1994 || Michael Jackson || Best Male Solo Singer || 
|-
| 1995 || Michael Jackson || Best Male Singer || 
|-
| 1996 || Michael Jackson || Best Male Singer ||

Songwriters Hall of Fame

|-
| 2002 || Michael Jackson || Songwriters Hall of Fame || 
|-

Soul Train Awards
The Soul Train Music Awards is an annual award show aired in national television syndication that honors the best in Black music and entertainment. It is produced by the makers of Soul Train, the program from which it takes its name, and features musical performances by various R&B and hip hop music recording artists interspersed throughout the ceremonies.

Jackson won six competitive trophies and was honored with four special awards, including the Sammy Davis Jr. Award for Entertainer of the Year and the Heritage Award for Career Achievement at the 1989 ceremony. In 1995, the awards show inducted him into their Hall of Fame. In 1997, the video award was renamed the "Michael Jackson Award for Best R&B/Soul or Rap Music Video" until 2004 where it was renamed in honor of Berry Gordy until the category was removed before the 2008 show. Since 2011, it's been presented as simply "Video of the Year".

On November 2, 1995, Jackson was one of several performers to take part in The Soul Train 25th Anniversary Hall of Fame Special, alongside Whitney Houston, Diana Ross, Stevie Wonder, MC Hammer, Patti LaBelle and Bill Withers. Jackson performed "Dangerous" and "You Are Not Alone" during that telecast. It was Jackson's second televised performance that year less than two months after he performed at the MTV Video Music Awards that year. Jackson was one of several inductees alongside Ross, Houston, LaBelle, Withers, Barry White, Curtis Mayfield and Marvin Gaye.

Jackson is only one of two artists to win the Sammy Davis Jr. Entertainer of the Year honor twice, first in 1989 and then in 2009 following his death that year. Beyoncé won it twice, one as member of Destiny's Child and later as a solo artist. After Jackson won the posthumous honor, which was accepted by his surviving brother Jermaine, however, the award was discontinued.

|- 
|rowspan="3"| 1988 ||rowspan"2"| "Bad"|| Best Single - Male || 
|-
| Bad || Album of the Year  - Male || 
|-
| "The Way You Make Me Feel" || Best Music Video || 
|- 
|rowspan="5"| 1989 || rowspan="2"| Michael Jackson|| Sammy Davis Jr. Award for Entertainer of the Year || 
|-
| Heritage Award for Career Achievement || 
|-
|rowspan="3"| Man in the Mirror || Best R&B/Soul Single – Male || 
|-
| Best R&B/Urban Contemporary Music Video || 
|-
| Best R&B/Urban Contemporary Song of the Year || 
|- 
|rowspan="2"| 1992 ||rowspan="2"| "Black Or White" || Best R&B/Soul Single – Male || 
|-
| Best Music Video || 
|- 
|rowspan="4"| 1993 || Michael Jackson || Humanitarian Award || 
|-
| Dangerous || Best R&B/Soul Album – Male || 
|-
| rowspan="2" | "Remember the Time" 
| Best R&B/Soul Single – Male
| 
|-
| Best Music Video
| 
|- 
|rowspan="3"| 1996 || "You Are Not Alone" || Best R&B/Soul Single - Male || 
|-
| HIStory: Past, Present and Future, Book I || Best R&B/Soul Album of the Year - Male || 
|-
| "Scream" (with Janet Jackson) || Best R&B/Soul or Rap Music Video|| 
|- 
| 2009 || Michael Jackson || Sammy Davis Jr. Entertainer of the Year|| 
|- 
| rowspan=3 | 2014
| rowspan=2 | "Love Never Felt So Good" (with Justin Timberlake)
| Song of the Year
| 
|-
| Best Collaboration
| 
|-
| rowspan=1 | "Xscape"
| Album of the Year
|

Hall of Fame 

|-
| 1995 || Michael Jackson || Hall of Fame || 
|-

Stinkers Bad Movie Awards

|-
| 2002 || Michael Jackson (for Men in Black II) || Most Distracting Celebrity Cameo Appearance || 
|-

Teen Choice Awards

|-
| 2010 || This Is It || Choice Movie: Dance || 
|-

The Telegatto Awards (Italy)

|-
| 1983 || Michael Jackson || Artist of the Year || 
|-

TMF Awards (Netherlands)
The TMF Awards Netherlands gave Jackson four awards.

|-
|| 1996 ||| Michael Jackson || Best International Singer || 
|-
|| 1996 ||| "Earth Song" || Best International Video Clip || 
|-
|| 1997 ||| Michael Jackson || Best International Singer || 
|-
|| 1997 ||| Michael Jackson || Best Live Act || 
|-

TV Land Awards

|-
|2007 || Moonwalking on Motown 25: Yesterday, Today, Forever || Televisions Greatest Music Moment ||

UK Music Hall of Fame
The UK Music Hall of Fame is an awards ceremony to honor musicians, of any nationality, for their lifetime contributions to music in the United Kingdom. In 2004, the first ceremony inducted five founding members and five additional members selected by a public televote, two from each of the last five decades.  The founding members were Madonna, The Beatles, Elvis Presley, Bob Marley and U2. Jackson was among five others selected by a public televote alongside Cliff Richard and The Shadows, the Rolling Stones, Queen and Robbie Williams.

|-
| 2004 || Michael Jackson || UK Music Hall of Fame || 
|-

United Negro College Fund

The United Negro College Fund (UNCF) is an American philanthropic organization that fundraises college tuition money for black students and general scholarship funds for 39 private historically black colleges and universities. The UNCF was incorporated on April 25, 1944, by Frederick D. Patterson, Mary McLeod Bethune, and others.

In 1988, they awarded Jackson with the Frederick Patterson Award.

|-
|rowspan="2"| 1988 ||rowspan="2"| Michael Jackson || Frederick Patterson Award || 
|-
| Doctor of Humane Letters ||

United States National Recording Registry

In 2009, Jackson's Thriller album was inducted into the U.S. National Recording Registry.
Each year, organizers select twenty-five recorded works to preserve in the Library of Congress archives based on historical, cultural or aesthetic significance. A recording is only eligible beginning 10 years after its creation.

|-
| 2009 || Thriller ||  Historical, Cultural or Aesthetic Significance || 
|-

Video Software Dealer Association

The Video Software Dealer's Association awarded Jackson with an award for Moonwalker movie in 1989.

|-
| 1989 || Moonwalker || Favorite Music Video || 
|-

Virgin Media Music Awards

|-
| 2010 || Michael Jackson || Legend Of The Year || 
|-

VH1 Awards
Vh1 (originally an initialism of Video Hits One) is an American pay television network based in New York City owned by ViacomCBS. It was originally created by Warner-Amex Satellite Entertainment, at the time a division of Warner Communications and the original owner of MTV, and launched on January 1, 1985, in the former space of Turner Broadcasting System's short-lived Cable Music Channel.

VH1 Honors
In 1995, Michael Jackson was the inaugural honoree of the VH1 International Humanitarian Award at the VH1 Honors, designed to recognize artists' efforts to help the world.

|- 
| 1995 || Michael Jackson || International Humanitarian Award ||

Webby Awards

A Webby Award is an award for excellence on the Internet presented annually by The International Academy of Digital Arts and Sciences, a judging body composed of over one thousand industry experts and technology innovators. Categories include websites; advertising and media; online film and video; mobile sites and apps; and social.

|-
| 2012 || Behind The Mask || Online Film & Video/Best Editing ||  
|-

World Awards

Michael Jackson was presented with a World Award in 2002.

|-
| 2002 || Michael Jackson || World Arts Award 2002 ||

World Music Awards

The World Music Awards (founded in 1989) is an international awards show that annually honors recording artists based on their worldwide sales figures, which are provided by the International Federation of the Phonographic Industry (IFPI). The awards show is conducted under the patronage of H.S.H. Prince Albert of Monaco, Monte-Carlo.

Jackson won six competitive awards, five special honors including the Artist of the Millennium and the Chopard Diamond award in 2006.

|- 
|1989 || "Dirty Diana" || Viewers Choice #1 Video || 
|-
|rowspan="2" | 1993 || Michael Jackson || Best Selling U.S. Artist of the Year || 
|-
| Michael Jackson || World's Best Selling Pop Artist || 
|-
|rowspan="3" | 1996 || Michael Jackson || Best Selling Male Artist  || 
|-
| Michael Jackson || Best Selling American Artist || 
|-
| Michael Jackson || Best Selling R&B Artist || 
|-
| 2008 || Michael Jackson || World's Best Selling Pop/Rock Male Artist ||

Special honors

|-
| 1993 ||  Michael Jackson || World's Best Selling Artist of the Era || 
|-
|rowspan="2" | 1996 || Michael Jackson || Best Selling Artist Ever || 
|-
| Thriller || Best Selling Record of All Time || 
|-
| 2000 || Michael Jackson || Best Selling Male Artist of the Millennium || 
|-
| 2006 || Michael Jackson || Diamond Award || 
|-

Philips Hall of Fame

Jackson was the first and only artist to be received the Philips Hall of Fame from the World Music Awards. Michael accepted the honor from singer Whitney Houston at his Neverland Ranch.

|-
| 1989 || Michael Jackson|| Philips Hall of Fame || 
|-

Guinness World Records

The Guinness World Records is a reference book published annually, containing a collection of world records, both human achievements and the extremes of the natural world.

The Guinness World Records, originally known as the Guinness Book of World Records, are not referred to as "awards" but as records that a person holds until it is broken by another person. Jackson currently holds 20 Guinness World Records out of a total of 39 records set in his lifetime, including best-selling album of all time and most expensive music video.

|- 
|rowspan="2" | 1984 || Thriller || Best-selling album of all time ||
|- 
| Michael Jackson || Most Grammy wins in one night || 
|-
| 1986 || Michael Jackson || Highest-paid commercial spokesperson || 
|- 
|rowspan="2"| 1988 || Bad at Wembley Stadium || Most successful concert series || 
|-
| Bad || Highest-grossing tour by a male solo artist || 
|- 
| 1990 || Michael Jackson || Highest fees for an entertainer || 
|-
| 1996 || "Scream" (Shared with Janet Jackson) || Most expensive short film || 
|-
| 1997 || Thriller || Best-selling album by a male soloist in the UK || 
|- 
|rowspan="2" | 1999 || Michael Jackson and Janet Jackson || Most successful siblings ||  
|-
| Michael Jackson || Youngest vocalist to top the US singles chart || 
|- 
|rowspan="2" | 2000 || Michael Jackson || Most charities supported by a pop star || 
|- 
| Michael Jackson || Longest span of No. 1 hits by an R&B artist || 
|- 
|rowspan="2"| 2002 || Ghosts || Longest music video || 
|-
| Making Michael Jackson's Thriller || Best-selling music video || 
|-
| 2006 || "You Are Not Alone" || First vocalist to enter the US single chart at No. 1  || 
|-
|| 2006 || Michael Jackson || Most hit songs on UK Singles chart in one calendar year  || 
|-
|rowspan="2" | 2009 || Michael Jackson || Most simultaneous charted singles in the UK charts in a year || 
|-
| Michael Jackson || Most American Music Awards won by a male artist || 
|-
|rowspan="2"| 2010 || Michael Jackson || Highest-earning deceased artist || 
|-
| Michael Jackson || Most searched for – male || 
|- 
|rowspan="2"| 2011 || Michael Jackson's This Is It || Highest-grossing concert film of all time || 
|-
| Michael Jackson || Longest span of US top 40 singles || 
|- 
| 2015 || "Black or White" || Largest TV audience for a video premiere || 
|-
| rowspan="3"| 2016 || Michael Jackson || Highest annual earnings for a celebrity ever  || 
|-
| Michael Jackson || Highest-earning dead celebrity  || 
|-
| Michael Jackson ||Most Viewed Wikipedia Page for a musician
| 
|-
| 2017 ||Thriller || Best-selling album (Canada) ||
|-
| 2017 ||Michael Jackson || Most Billboard Music Awards won ||
|-

Decorations

From Gabon 
 Officer of the National Order of Merit

In 1992, during a visit to Gabon, Michael became the first (and only) entertainer to receive the National Order of Merit from President Omar Bongo.

Keys to the City
  September 1987: Osaka, Japan. During a break from performing in Osaka, as part of the Bad world tour, Jackson was awarded the Key to the City by Mayor Yasushi Oshima.
  April 21, 1988: Chicago, Illinois. Upon performing three sold-out concerts at the Metropolitan Chicago's Rosemont Horizon in April 1988, Jackson received the Key to the City from Mayor Eugene Sawyer, who cited the entertainer for his onstage performance and humanitarian philanthropy. Jackson shared his honor backstage with internationally renowned singer, dancer, and actress Lola Falana, who was also waging a courageous battle against multiple sclerosis.
  June 11, 2003: Gary, Indiana. Michael Jackson received Key to the City of Gary from Mayor Scott King.
  October 25, 2003: Las Vegas, Nevada. Jackson was given the Key to the City of Las Vegas from Mayor Oscar Goodman; the mayor also made the date "Michael Jackson Day".
  June 15, 2018: Detroit, Michigan. Jackson was posthumously awarded the Key to the City of Detroit during the Detroit Music Weekend 2018.

Royal titles and styles

Africa
 Kingdom of Sanwi
 19922009: King Sani Nanan Amalaman Anoh, High Prince of the Agni people.

In a high-profile visit to Africa, in 1992 Jackson visited several countries, among them Gabon and Egypt. In his trip to Côte d'Ivoire, Jackson was crowned "King Sani" by the king of the Sanwi, a kingdom of the Agni people. He then signed official documents formalizing his chieftaincy, sat on a golden throne under the sacred Krindja tree, and presided over ceremonial dances. He held the title up until his death. Jesse Jackson was later created the High Prince of the Agni people of Côte d'Ivoire following Michael Jackson's passing away.

Other honors
In December 1984, Jackson was voted "Hero Of Young America" in a poll of 4,000 teenagers by The World Almanac and Book of Facts.
On November 20, 1984, with the installation of Star No. 1,793 of the Hollywood Walk of Fame in front of Grauman's Chinese Theatre, Jackson became the first celebrity to have two stars in the same category, having received one as a member of The Jacksons in 1980.
During the 1984 Summer Olympics, the Jackson family was given the Medal of Friendship Award.
In 1984, the NAACP announced that Michael Jackson and his brothers were named honorary co-chairmen of the civil rights organization's National Voter Registration Drive. Registration booths were set up outside Arrowhead Stadium in Kansas City, Missouri, the venue of his Victory tour's opening concert on July 4.
In 1984, the Brotman Medical Center, which treated Jackson for second and third-degree burns on his scalp following a pyrotechnic incident while filming a Pepsi commercial, renamed their burn center to the Michael Jackson Burn Center, and gave him a plaque called the Michael Jackson Burn Center Plaque, in honor of the singer.
In 1985, stamps featuring Michael Jackson were printed in the British Virgin Islands.
Jackson was included in TIME Magazine's All-TIME 100 Fashion Icons list in 2012.
Michael Jackson is the second most sculpted of all the Madame Tussauds wax figures, with a total of 19 pieces in their museums around the world. Only Queen Elizabeth II has been portrayed more often.
Mesoparapylocheles michaeljacksoni, an extinct hermit crab which existed during the Albian or Cenomanian age in what is now Spain, is named after Jackson.
A crater on the Moon, previously known as Posidonius J (located on the Lake of Dreams), has been renamed after Jackson by the Lunar Republic Society.
In 1998, Daikaku Chodoin (the founder and president of the United World Karate Association) presented Jackson with the Honorary Chairmanship of the United World Karate Association and a godan (fifth degree) black belt.
Michael Jackson was made an honorary member of the New Westminster Police Department in 1984 while in British Columbia, Canada. On November 19, appointed police constable "PC 49", he promised to "serve the Queen and cause the peace to be kept and preserved".
On June 20, 1988, Michael Jackson arrives in Paris, France, P.R.-ist Bob Jones and bodyguard Wayne Nagin. The city's mayor at the time, Jacques Chirac, honoured Jackson  the Grand Vermeil Medal of the City of Paris, equivalent to the Keys to the City.
On July 22, 1988, Disney characters, Mickey Mouse and Donald Duck, present an elated star with a pair of specially engraved ice skates backstage before his concert in Wembley, England.
In 1988, his autobiography, "Moonwalk", makes The New York Times' publication Best Seller List as the number 1 Best Seller of the year.
In 1989, Michael Jackson's former elementary school, the Gardner Street Elementary in Los Angeles, designated its school auditorium the "Michael Jackson Auditorium". Mr. Jackson appeared at the ceremony, in which the school children sang his hit song, "We Are the World". In 2003, after accusations of child molestation, the school chose to cover Jackson's name with plywood. The school board stated that the request had come from some parents who "felt more comfortable with it covered". Jackson's spokesperson stated that he wondered "what those parents will say when Mr. Jackson is exonerated". At the end of the trial Jackson was acquitted of all charges. Recently, following petitions and letters to City Council and the Gardner Street Elementary School superintendent and principal, the "Michael Jackson Auditorium" sign has been uncovered. Jackson was named Most Famous Alumnus of Gardner Street Elementary School, in Hollywood, California and the school auditorium was renamed for him in 1989.
On February 23, 1995, Michael gave a special preview of some of the songs off his forthcoming album HIStory to the National Association of Recording Merchandisers. The NARM presented him with the Harold Chapin Humanitarian Award at the preview.
In 2002 Michael Jackson was presented with the 30th Anniversary Award by its designer, Nijel, who also designed the Top Selling Artist Of The Decade Award in 1990. The award was given by the fans, celebrating him being on stage for 30 years. Fans all over the world donated money to contribute for the award to being created.
In 2007, Jackson visited the United States Army base south of Tokyo and was commemorated with a letter of appreciation from the Colonel.
On Australia Day 2012, Jackson was honored by being immortalized at the Grauman's Chinese Theater by his children, Prince, Paris and Blanket Jackson. Among many other celebrities there to pay tribute to him were Quincy Jones, Chris Tucker, Smokey Robinson, Justin Bieber with performances made by the Glee cast and Cirque Du Soliel and many other.
Michael Jackson Award Belt - Versace black leather belt with gold hardware belt buckles adorned with colorful gemstones in the amount of 4 million with fluer de lis ornament pattern. belt inscribed "Presented to Michael Jackson from Sony Music UK 1992" and is contained in custom wood and container plaxiglass.
Precious metal gold microphone on a burl walnut plaque reading "Presented to Michael Jackson by The Prince's Trust in recognition of outstanding support it".
Shadow box display in the style of Jackson's album Dangerous in 1991. Award plaque reads in full "triple platinum record awarded to Michael Jackson for sale in Switzerland more than 150,000 units of Sony Music Entertainment AG Dangerous."
In 1997, Jackson was awarded a Diamond Award and was named one of the princes of Africa in a prestigious ceremony with various high-profile political leaders of Africa.
In 1989 Rock Over Europe Awards awarded Jackson with the Children of the world music video award.
1989 - CEBA (Creative Excellence in Business Advertising) awards the plaque reading "Motown On Showtime" presented to "Michael Jackson The Legend Continues" Michael Jackson, Co-Executive Producer, 1989.
Small metal banded glass balls topped with a crown design metal reading "Germany Music Servat Mundum 1992" commemorating "MJ King of Music".
Silver goblets mounted to a marble base with a plaque reading in full "Michael Jackson Superstar of The Century -. Magazine "
Lucite award reads "Rock" with the text printed on the base reads in full "The Children of the world video awards 1989 Rock IM & MC Over Europe."
Player awards metal sculpture in the style of Rodin's The Thinker. A metal plaque on the front reads in full "World of Art Award 2002 World Michael Jackson presented by President Mikhail S. Gorbachev ".
Piece curve patinaed black metal to make it look like a piece of paper resting on a cushion of black velvet and faux pearls lined presentation. The award reads in full "Michael Jackson / The Power of Music / is the strength of Soul./VH1 Honors / The Musicians Who Goes / Share Beyond / Soul and Share Time / Energy and Resources / For Help Others/Vh1 Honors / June 22, 1995 "

See also
List of Michael Jackson records and achievements
Grammy Award milestones
Honorific nicknames in popular music
The Greatest American
Michael Jackson Video Vanguard Award

Notes

References

Sources

George, Nelson (2004). Michael Jackson: The Ultimate Collection booklet. Sony BMG.

External links
Informative site on Michael Jackson's awards and achievements

Awards
Jackson, Michael